The Rapa Valley (Swedish: Rapadalen, Sami: Ráhpavágge) is a  long valley in Sweden and the largest in the Sarek National Park, part of the Laponian area. The Rapa River runs through the valley, which is surrounded by steep mountains. It's Laitaure river delta is one of the major tourist attractions for hikers in the area.

References

Further reading

Valleys of Sweden
Sarek National Park
Landforms of Norrbotten County